Robert Smeaton White (March 15, 1856 – December 5, 1944) was a Canadian journalist and political figure. He represented Cardwell from 1888 to 1895, Mount Royal from 1925 to 1935 and Saint-Antoine—Westmount from 1935 to 1940 as a Conservative member.

He was born in Peterborough, Canada West in 1856, the son of Thomas White and Esther Vine, and studied at McGill University. In 1882, he married Ruth McDougall. He worked for a wholesale merchant at Montreal and then the Bank of Montreal, before joining the Montreal Gazette in 1884. White later became chief editor for the paper. In 1888, he married Annie Barclay after the death of his first wife. He was first elected to the House of Commons in an 1888 by-election held in Cardwell after the death of his father. In 1896, he was appointed customs collector at Montreal. White ran unsuccessfully as a member of the National Government Party in Saint-Antoine—Westmount in 1940. He died in Westmount on December 5, 1944 at the age of 88.

References 

1856 births
1944 deaths
Conservative Party of Canada (1867–1942) MPs
Members of the House of Commons of Canada from Ontario
Members of the House of Commons of Canada from Quebec
Anglophone Quebec people
Canadian newspaper editors
Canadian male journalists
Journalists from Ontario
Montreal Gazette people